Kristina Tremasova (born on 13 March 1995 in Nizhny Novgorod, Russia) is a Bulgarian ice dancer. Her partner is Dimitar Lichev. She teamed up with Dimitar Lichev in 2009. They participated at the 2011 World Championships in Moscow, ended in 16th place in preliminaries. They also reached 15th place in prelims at 2011 European Championships.

References

External links 
 

Bulgarian female ice dancers
Living people
1995 births
People from Nizhny Novgorod